The Girl and the Devil (Swedish: Flickan och djävulen) is a 1944 Swedish mystery thriller film directed by Hampe Faustman and starring Kolbjörn Knudsen, Gunn Wållgren and Stig Järrel. It was shot at the Centrumateljéerna Studios in Stockholm with location shooting in Hälsingland. The film's sets were designed by the art director P.A. Lundgren.

Cast
 Kolbjörn Knudsen – Klas the Farmer
 Ingrid Borthen – His wife
 Hilda Borgström – Midwife
 Elsa Widborg – Marit the Witch
 Tord Stål – The Writer
 Gunn Wållgren – Karin
 Stig Järrel – The Peddler (The Devil)
 Sven Miliander – Mattias
 Linnéa Hillberg – Elin, his wife
 Anders Ek – Olof
 Toivo Pawlo – Hans
 Julia Cæsar – Gammel-Kersti 
 Gull Natorp – Woman Being Forced to Buy a Skirt
 Carl Ström – Jonas
 Gösta Gustafson – The Tailor
 Rudolf Wendbladh – Reverend at Harvest Festival
 Hugo Jacobsson – Garv-Johan
 Hanny Schedin – Maid
 Erland Colliander – Farmer at Harvest Festival
 Britt Ångström – Maid
 Gert Lilienberg – Young Man Who Saw a Witch
 Birger Åsander – Listening Man
 Sture Ericson – Man at Harvest Festival

References

Bibliography 
 Qvist, Per Olov & von Bagh, Peter. Guide to the Cinema of Sweden and Finland. Greenwood Publishing Group, 2000.

External links 
 

1944 films
Swedish mystery films
1944 mystery films
1940s Swedish-language films
Films directed by Hampe Faustman
Swedish black-and-white films
1940s Swedish films